Lillesands-Posten is a local Norwegian newspaper that is published in Lillesand and Birkenes municipalities in Aust-Agder. It has been published since the 1870. The newspaper is owned by Agderposten Medier and is the sister paper of Agderposten. It comes out twice a week, Tuesday and Friday.

The newspapers language is Bokmål, and it is published in Tabloid (newspaper format).

Circulation
Confirmed circulation figures by Mediebedriftenes Landsforening (Newspaper Publishers' Association), Norway: 
 2006: 3,571
 2007: 3,650
 2008: 3,792
 2009: 3,757
 2010: 3,759

References

External links
Lillesands-Posten Homepage

1870 establishments in Norway
Mass media in Aust-Agder
Birkenes
Lillesand
Newspapers published in Norway
Norwegian-language newspapers
Publications established in 1870